Burgee is a surname. Notable people with the surname include: 

John Burgee (born 1933), American architect
Louis Burgee (1890–1966), American baseball player

See also
Burges